The 1940 United States Senate election in Tennessee was held on November 5, 1940. Incumbent Democratic Senator Kenneth D. McKellar was re-elected to a fifth term in office, defeating Republican Howard Baker.

Democratic primary

Candidates
Kenneth McKellar, incumbent Senator since 1917
John Randolph Neal Jr., attorney, academic, and perennial candidate
Claude C. Tolen

Results

General election

Candidates
Howard Baker Sr., former State Representative and candidate for Governor in 1938 (Republican)
Kenneth McKellar, incumbent Senator since 1917 (Democratic)
John Randolph Neal Jr., attorney, academic, and perennial candidate (Independent)

Results

See also
1940 United States Senate elections

References

1940
Tennessee
United States Senate